Morning Express (Simplified Chinese: 阳光列车) is a 20-episode Singaporean television drama series produced by Television Corporation of Singapore in 1995. It revolves around a dedicated secondary school teacher, who, after some bad brushes with the law in the past, seeks to inspire his students.

Cast 

 Chen Hanwei as Fang Ansheng

Awards and nominations

References 

Singapore Chinese dramas
1995 Singaporean television series debuts
1995 Singaporean television series endings
Channel 8 (Singapore) original programming